Alex McArthur (born March 6, 1957) is an American actor.

Early life and education 
He was born in Telford, Pennsylvania, the son of Bruce, a contractor, and Dolores McArthur. He studied acting at De Anza College and San Jose State University, and worked as a bartender at the legendary nightclub Studio 54 in New York.

Career 
McArthur became known for portraying Charlie Reece in the film Rampage, and Duell McCall in the western TV film series Desperado, whose original screenplay was written by Elmore Leonard. He was nominated for Gemini Awards for Best Performance by an Actor in a Supporting Role, for the television film Woman on the Run: The Lawrencia Bembenek Story.

He also appeared in the music video for Madonna's song "Papa Don't Preach", a segment of The Immaculate Collection video compilation, as Madonna's boyfriend and the father of her child in the video.

Personal life 
On December 21, 2019, McArthur's son Jacob was shot and killed in Oroville, California. A suspect was arrested on July 12, 2021.

Filmography

Film

Television

References

External links
 
 

1957 births
Male actors from Pennsylvania
American male film actors
American male television actors
People from Bucks County, Pennsylvania
People from Montgomery County, Pennsylvania
Living people